The current vehicle registration plate system of Cuba was introduced in May 2013. Current plates are European standard 520 mm × 110 mm, completely replacing the previous system introduced in 2002. The international vehicle registration code for Cuba is C.

New registration system 
The new system uses a standard manufacturer format, where the alphanumeric code will have one letter and six digits, grouped into two groups of three to facilitate identification (A 123 456), in the case of vehicles, such as cars and trucks, and a letter and five digits for motorcycles.

In this way, 20 million possible combinations can be obtained in the case of the first vehicles and 1,699,983 variants for motorcycles. Cars and trucks will have license plates 420 mm long by 110 mm wide; and motorcycles with 200 mm length by 140 mm width.

All the badges are white with black characters and have a page on the top right and an image of the Island of Cuba, printed with a laser as a security measure. A blue band (Euroband) on the far left with the word CUBA in a vertical position will have the license plates of legal entities, an element that will differentiate them from the license plates of natural persons, when the variety of background colors disappears, since the plates will not identify the sector to which the medium belongs.

In this system, the province to which the vehicle belongs is not reflected, as was the case previously, but only certain sectors are identified, which allows for an increase in alphanumeric combinations, facilitating continuous production, reducing the deposit of license plates in each province and reusing reservations available in any territory.

The letter A identifies the official license plates, currently white; the letters C, D, and E, for the diplomatic sector; the letter K for foreigners, the letters F and M to identify FAR and MININT, respectively, and the T, for vehicles rented to tourism. The rest of the letters have no meaning.

Vehicles assigned to the protocol service will also be identified with a sticker with a dark blue border and the text 'PROTOCOL. The vehicles belonging to the foreign press will also have a sticker with a green border and the text 'P.EXT. Both decals will be placed in the center of the top of the front windshield. The letters I, O, Q, S, W and Z will not be used to avoid confusion in identification.

In cases of loss or deterioration, the license plate will be changed for a new one and that provisional plate that previously existed, red in color, will be eliminated. In this way, the lost license plate can be circulated, thus eliminating illegalities with those stolen or found, and the owners, who previously attended twice for this procedure, will only do so once.

The benefits of the registration change refer to the acquisition of larger quantities at lower prices, as a result of the reduction in the number of color combinations. Losses and damages should be reduced with the implementation of this system, since the plates will have a better fixation in the defenses of the vehicles, eliminating the vibrations of the plate due to the effects of the air.

Prior registration systems 
The automobile license plates of Cuba in the period 2002 to 2013, contained three letters and three digits. The color of the plates is also an important element of identification. Ordinary (non-special) plates had a number at the bottom center of the plate ranging from 0 to 9, indicating the type of vehicle.

1920s-2002
From the 1950s through 1978, and again from 2002 through 2013, plates were North American standard 6 × 12 inches (152 × 300 mm).

2002 format

Cuban vehicle registration plates contained three letters and three numbers. The colour of plates is also an important identification element. Ordinary (non-special) licence plates have also a number on the lower central part of the plate ranging from 0 to 9, denoting the type of the vehicle.  As of 2016, some of these plates are still in use, but are being phased out. Particular refers to privately owned vehicles. The letter denotes the expiry month: E = Enero (January), J = Julio (July).

The first letter denotes the province where the licence plate was issued. Until 2011, "B" was used by the former La Habana Province.

The second letter identifies the type of vehicle owner.

The vehicle type number can be found on the lower central part of the plate, it is a one digit number ranging from 0 to 9, it denotes the type of the vehicle. This is not used on special licence plates.

Special licence plates

Cars of the Cuban Army and the Cuban Ministry of Interior use plates with one letter (A, B, C, F or S) followed by five digits. On the cars of the Cuban Army there is a "FAR" (Fuerzas Armadas Revolucionarias) inscription in the central lower part of the licence plate. In the case of the Ministry of Interior, there is a "MININT" (Ministerio del Interior) inscription. Licence plates of the Army are always light green, while plates of the Ministry of Interior are dark green.

Diplomatic cars use 6 digits without preceding letters. There is a "D", "C" or "E" letter in the lower left part of the licence plate (D = diplomatic, C - consular, E - other status). They have a black licence plate.

Cars for hire have a dark red licence plate beginning with "T" letter (meaning turista), followed by five digits in white color. The border of the plate is also in white.

Provisional licence plates are light red and have the normal code of the province followed by 4 digits and a "P" letter.

Cars of the United States military in the Guantanamo Bay use licence plates with one letter and four numbers, and texts "U.S.N.B." and "Gtmo Bay Cuba".

Notes

References

 CUBA 2006 UPDATE, by Jean-Emmanuel Chevry
 License Plates Of The World, Cuba
 Where's That Vehicle Come From?
 Cuba Transportation Number plates
 Cuba Maniaks
 In Cuba, license plates tag drivers, not the car
 Pictures and information about Cuba's license plate (in Spanish)

External links

Cuba
Cuba transport-related lists
Road transport in Cuba